Ramiro Augusto Cepeda (born 25 April 1975) is a former Argentine football manager and former player . He currently is the manager for Liga Nacional club Antigua.

Honours

Club 
Alianza F.C.
 Primera División
 Runners-up: Apertura 2012

Club 
Antigua GFC
Liga Nacional de Guatemala
 Runners-up: Apertura 2022

References

External links
 Ramiro Cepeda at Soccerway 

Living people
1975 births
Footballers from Buenos Aires
Argentine footballers
Deportivo Zacapa players
C.D. Suchitepéquez players
C.D. Atlético Marte footballers
Argentine football managers
C.D. Luis Ángel Firpo managers
Universidad SC managers
Deportivo Petapa managers
Club Xelajú MC managers
Expatriate footballers in El Salvador
Expatriate football managers in El Salvador
Expatriate football managers in Guatemala
Argentine expatriate sportspeople in El Salvador
Argentine expatriate sportspeople in Guatemala
Association football midfielders